96 °C Café (simplified Chinese: 96 °C 咖啡), is a Singaporean television drama series. It stars Tay Ping Hui, Desmond Tan, Julie Tan, Romeo Tan, Chris Tong and Ian Fang as the main characters in the story. The story revolves around 96 °C Café's business and romantic relationships between the cast.

Prior to the drama serial, prequels of 8 webisodes in total were released on xinfirst's portal progressively, for a period of 4 weeks, Mondays from 18 February to 11 March 2013. The main drama was broadcast on MediaCorp Channel 8 in Singapore from 29 April 2013 to 24 May 2013, and a total of 20 episodes were aired during this period.

Prequel webisodes

Main drama episodes

See also
96°C Café
List of programmes broadcast by Mediacorp Channel 8

References

Lists of Singaporean television series episodes
Lists of web series episodes
Mediacorp